Chena Achena is a 1983 Bengali drama film directed by Pinaki Chaudhuri. The music of the film was composed by Abhijit Bandyopadhyay.

Cast
 Soumitra Chatterjee
 Amol Palekar
 Biplab Chatterjee
 Tanuja
 Chhaya Debi
 Nandini Maliya
 Nirmal Ghosh

Soundtrack
"Amay Rakhte Jodi" - Hemanta Mukherjee
"Shono Shono" - Hemanta Mukherjee 
"O Amar Sona Bondhure" - Hemanta Mukherjee
"Koto Swapna Chhilo" - Aarti Mukherjee
"Eki Path Jeno" - Hemanta Mukherjee 
"Jouban Palashe Agun" - Aarti Mukherjee

References

External links
 
 Chena Achena (1999) on Gomolo

Bengali-language Indian films
1983 films
1980s Bengali-language films
Indian drama films